Kimboraga is a genus of air-breathing land snails, terrestrial pulmonate gastropod mollusks in the family Camaenidae.

Species 
Species within the genus Kimbora include:
 Kimboraga exanimus
 Kimboraga koolanensis
 Kimboraga micromphala
 Kimboraga yammerana

References 

 Nomenclator Zoologicus info

 
Camaenidae
Taxonomy articles created by Polbot